Year 1275 (MCCLXXV) was a common year starting on Tuesday (link will display the full calendar) of the Julian calendar.

Events 
 By place 

 Byzantine Empire 
 Battle of Neopatras: Emperor Michael VIII (Palaiologos) assembles a Byzantine expeditionary force (some 30,000 men), mostly mercenaries from Bulgaria, Serbia and the Sultanate of Rum. He places these forces under his own brother, John Palaiologos, and General Alexios Kaballarios. Michael sends them against Thessaly, and is supported by the Byzantine navy led by Admiral Alexios Doukas Philanthropenos, who is ordered to attack the Latin principalities and prevent them from aiding John I (Angelos), ruler of Thessaly. John is caught by surprise by the rapid advance of the Byzantine forces and is bottled up with a garrison in his capital of Neopatras, which the Byzantines proceed to lay siege. John manages to escape: he climbs down the walls of the fortress with a rope and walks through the Byzantine lines. After 3 days, John reaches Thebes, where he requests the aid of John I de la Roche, duke of Athens. He receives some 500 horsemen with whom he returns to Neopatras. Meanwhile, the Byzantine forces have been weakened, with several detachments sent off to capture other forts or plunder the region. The Byzantines panic under the sudden attack of a smaller but disciplined Latin force and breaks completely when a Cuman contingent switches sides. Despite John's attempt to rally his forces, they flee and scatter.
 Battle of Demetrias: Michael VIII (Palaiologos) sends a Byzantine fleet led by Alexios Philanthropenos, to harass the Latin coasts. A joint Latin fleet composed of Lombard and Venetian vessels from Negroponte (Euboea) and Venetian-held Crete, is variously given at 30 to 60 ships. The Latin fleet under Admiral Guglielmo II da Verona gets the Byzantines by surprise and their attack is so effective that they almost win. Their ships, on which high wooden towers have been erected, have the advantage, and many Byzantine seamen and soldiers are killed or drowned. Just as victory seem theirs, Greek reinforcements arrive, led by John I (Angelos). His arrival boosts the Byzantines' morale, and John's men, ferried on board the ships by small boats, begin to replenish their casualties and turn the tide. The Latin casualties are heavy, which also include Guglielmo. By nightfall, all but two Latin ships have been captured.

 Europe 
 May 13 – Marinid forces led by Sultan Abu Yusuf Yaqub ibn Abd al-Haqq land in Spain upon a call from Muhammad II, ruler of Granada. With a fleet of 20 ships organized at Ceuta, some 5,000 men are transported from Alcázar Seguir to Tarifa. Without meeting any significant Christian opposition. The Maranids raid as far as the towns of Vejer de la Frontera and Jerez.
 June 14 – Battle of Hova: King Valdemar Birgersson is defeated by his brother Magnus in the forest of Tiveden.
 July 22 – Magnus III deposes Valdemar Birgersson and is elected new king of Sweden at the Stones of Mora.
 September 8 – Battle of Écija: A Castilian army led by Nuño González de Lara is defeated by Marinid forces.
 October 21 – Battle of Martos: A Castilian army under Sancho of Aragon is defeated by the Moors at Martos.
 October 27 – Floris V, count of Holland, grants the city of Amsterdam freedom from taxes (called a road toll).
 December 12 – Battle of Roccavione: Ghibelline forces defeat a Neapolitan army at Roccavione (Piedmont).

 England 
 Spring – King Edward I (Longshanks) demands a meeting with Llywelyn ap Gruffudd, prince of Wales, at Chester to pay homage, but Llywelyn refuses. In an attempt to stir up internal problems, Llywelyn seeks to marry the 23-year-old Eleanor of Montfort, daughter of Simon de Montfort. But Eleanor is captured by English pirates (employed by Edward) on the journey from France to meet Llywelyn. She is held prisoner at Windsor Castle and used as a bargaining chip over the coming years, in Edward's attempts to subjugate Llywelyn and Wales. 
 April 22 – The first Statute of Westminster, drawn up between Parliament and Edward I (Longshanks), defines the legal privileges that landowners are allowed. These are based on the investigations carried out in 1274, into the landowner's rights to own their land. Establishing a series of laws into 51 chapters, including equal treatment of rich and poor, free and fair elections, and definition of Bailable and non-bailable offenses.
 September 11 – 1275 British earthquake: The earthquake struck the south of Great Britain. The epicentre is unknown, although it may have been in the Portsmouth-Chichester area on the south coast of England or in Glamorgan, Wales.
 October 8 – Battle of Ronaldsway: Scottish forces under John de Vesci defeat the Manx of the Isle of Man in a decisive battle, firmly establishing Scottish rule of the island.
 The first main survey of the Hundred Rolls, an English census seen as a follow-up to the Domesday Book completed in 1086, is finished; it began in 1274.

 Africa 
 Marinid forces take the city of Algiers, at that time independent.

 Asia 
 March – Mongol forces (some 200,000 men) under Bayan of the Baarin (Hundred Eyes) defeat a Chinese army of 130,000 men led by the Song chancellor Jia Sidao on the Yangtze River. Sidao sends an emissary to Bayan to discuss a truce, but he declines to negotiate. Dowager Empress Xie Daoqing strips Sidao of his rank and titles, and is later on her orders executed by one of his own guards, as he is sent to exile in Fujian.
 The 21-year-old Marco Polo together with his father and uncle, Niccolò and Maffeo Polo, arrives at Kublai Khan's opulent summer palace at Shangdu (or Xanadu), after a 4-year journey. They present the "Great Khan" sacred oil from Jerusalem and papal letters of Pope Gregory X. Kublai takes Marco into his royal court and appoints him as a 'special envoy' (possibly as a tax collector). 
 The mountain fortress Alamut Castle (Eagle's Nest) is temporarily recaptured from the Mongols by a Nizari force under Shams al-Din Muhammad.Virani, Shafique N.; Virani, Assistant Professor Departments of Historical Studies and the Study of Religion Shafique N. (2007). The Ismailis in the Middle Ages: A History of Survival, a Search for Salvation, p. 32. Oxford University Press, USA. .
 April – The Japanese era Bun'ei ends and the Kenji era begins during the reign of the 8-year-old Emperor Go-Uda (until 1278).

 By topic 

 Art and Science 
 Jean de Meun completes the French allegorical work of fiction, Roman de la Rose, with a second section (the first section was written by Guillaume de Lorris in 1230).

 Markets 
 In Ghent, the first instance is recorded of emission of life annuities by a town in the Low Countries; this event confirms a trend of consolidation of local public debt in northwestern Europe, initiated in 1218 by Reims.

 Technology 
 The verge escapement, a simple type of escapement used in clocks, is invented (approximate date).

 Religion 
 August – Gregory X persuades King Alfonso X (the Wise) to give up his claim to the title of "King of the Romans". Gregory gains support in northern Italy through Rudolf I, king of Germany.
 Ramon Llull, Spanish scholar and theologian, establishes a school in Majorca to teach Arabic to preachers, in an attempt to aid proselytizing to Moors. He also discovers diethyl ether.
 Rabban Bar Sauma, Chinese Nestorian monk, embarks on a pilgrimage from China to Jerusalem. He travels to Hotan, Kashgar, Taraz and Khorasan (modern Afghanistan).
 The era of the tosafot (medieval commentators on the Talmud) ends (it began in 1100).

Births 
 August 18 – Bartholomew Badlesmere, English nobleman (d. 1322)
 September 27 – John II (the Peaceful), Dutch nobleman (d. 1312)
 October 20 – Chungseon (or Wang Jang), Korean ruler (d. 1325)
 Andrew Horn, English scholar, chamberlain and writer (d. 1328)
 Aymer de Valence, Anglo-French nobleman and knight (d. 1324)
 Dnyaneshwar, Indian Hindu poet, philosopher and writer (d. 1296)
 Eleanor of Brittany, Anglo-Norman Benedictine abbess (d. 1342)
 Fernando de la Cerda, Spanish nobleman and prince (d. 1322)
 Fujiwara no Tamefuji, Japanese nobleman and poet (d. 1324)
 Gasan Jōseki, Japanese Sōtō Zen monk and disciple (d. 1366)
 Gerard of Lunel, French nobleman, monk and hermit (d. 1298) 
 Gregory of Raska, Serbian copyist, bishop and writer (d. 1321) 
 Gueraula de Codines, Spanish folk healer and occultist (d. 1340)
 Hōjō Morotoki, Japanese nobleman and regent (shikken) (d. 1311)
 Hugues de Bouville, French nobleman and chamberlain (d. 1331)
 Jón Halldórsson, Norwegian cleric, priest and bishop (d. 1339)
 Musō Soseki, Japanese Rinzai Zen monk and teacher (d. 1351)
 Peter of Zittau, Bohemian abbot, historian and writer (d. 1339)
 Takatsukasa Fuyuhira, Japanese nobleman and regent (d. 1327)
 William of Alnwick, English friar, bishop and theologian (d. 1333)

Deaths 
 January 6 – Raymond of Penyafort, Spanish priest (b. 1175)
 January 26 – Ulrich von Liechtenstein, German poet (b. 1200)
 February 8 – Paio Peres Correia, Portuguese Grand Master 
 February 11 – Urania of Worms, German Jewish precentress
 February 26 – Margaret of England, queen of Scotland (b. 1240)
 March 5 – Shi Tianze, Chinese general and politician (b. 1202)
 March 9 – Fujiwara no Chōshi, Japanese empress (b. 1218)
 March 24 – Beatrice of England, countess of Richmond (b. 1242)
 April 13 – Eleanor of England, countess of Leicester (b. 1215)
 May 6 – Marie of Brienne, Latin empress and regent (b. 1224)
 May 21 – Cecile of Baux, Savoyan noblewoman and regent
 May 29 – Sophie of Thuringia, duchess of Brabant (b. 1224)
 June 17 – Arghun Aqa (the Elder), Mongol nobleman (b. 1210)
 August 15 – Lorenzo Tiepolo (or Theupolo), doge of Venice
 September 8 – Nuño González de Lara, Spanish nobleman
 September 24 – Humphrey IV de Bohun, English nobleman 
 October 21 – Sancho of Aragon, archbishop of Toledo (b. 1250)
 October 23 – Ferdinand de la Cerda, Spanish prince (b. 1255)
 November 23 – Margaret of Bar, French noblewoman (b. 1220)
 December 17 – Eric Birgersson, Swedish nobleman (b. 1250)
 Beatrice of Sicily, Latin empress of Constantinople (b. 1252)
 Bernard IV of Lippe, German nobleman and knight (b. 1230)
 Bohemond VI (the Fair), Outremer prince and knight (b. 1237)
 Dietrich VI of Meissen, German nobleman and knight (b. 1226)
 Fujiwara no Tameie, Japanese waka poet and writer (b. 1198)
 Geoffrey of Briel (or Bruyères), Achaean nobleman (b. 1223)
 Jia Sidao, Chinese politician and Grand Chancellor (b. 1213)
 John FitzJohn, English nobleman and rebel leader (b. 1240)
 Kujō Tadaie, Japanese nobleman and chancellor (b. 1229) 
 Luca Grimaldi, Genoese troubadour, politician and diplomat
 Paul Balog, Hungarian vice-chancellor and bishop (b. 1227)
 Xueting Fuyu, Chinese Buddhist monk and abbot (b. 1203)

References